Edward Allen was a footballer who played in The Football League for Southend United. He was born in London, England.

References

English footballers
Southend United F.C. players
English Football League players
Year of birth missing
Year of death missing
Association football forwards